The KFM 107 is a two-cylinder, two-stroke, single ignition, horizontally opposed aircraft engine designed for ultralight aircraft and motor gliders.

The engine was designed and produced by the KFM (Komet Flight Motor) Aircraft Motors Division of Italian American Motor Engineering of Italy and has been out of production since 1986.

Development
The KFM 107 is a conventional twin-cylinder engine that is very compact and light weight at only  in its 107s version. The engine features single capacitor discharge ignition, a single Tillotson butterfly-type carburetor, integral fuel pump, tuned exhaust system and reed valve induction. It was offered with 2:1 belt drive reduction system. Starting is electric starter or recoil starter.

Variants
107s
"Standard" version, direct drive, recoil start, weight 
107e
"Electric" version, direct drive, electric start and alternator , weight 
107rs
"Standard with Reduction" version, reduction drive, weight 
107er
"Electric & Reduction" version, direct drive, weight 
107e Maxi
Upgraded version with an OVC carburetor with fixed jets,  stroke, 334 cc (20.38 cu in), 11:1 compression ratio, 2.1:1 or optional 2.55:1 reduction drive.

Applications

Specifications (107s)

See also

References

Air-cooled aircraft piston engines
Two-stroke aircraft piston engines